Hythe railway station was a railway station serving the town of Hythe in Kent and was positioned just after the railway crossed Blackhouse Hill. On the Sandgate Branch line the station had two platforms, and a brick built station building.

It was ceremonially opened on 9 October 1874, and opened fully the next day. Being inland of the town it served the station was never popular. Following the closure of the section to Sandgate station in 1931 the line to Sandling Junction was reduced to single track. Hythe closed in 1943 during the Second World War but was reopened in 1945. Hythe station was closed along with the line in 1951.

The station area has been completely redeveloped for housing.

References

External links
 Station on 1947 OS Map

Disused railway stations in Kent
Railway stations in Great Britain opened in 1874
Railway stations in Great Britain closed in 1943
Railway stations in Great Britain opened in 1945
Railway stations in Great Britain closed in 1951
Former South Eastern Railway (UK) stations
1874 establishments in England
1951 disestablishments in England